Oreolyce quadriplaga, the Naga hedge blue, is a small butterfly found in India that belongs to the lycaenids or blues family.

Taxonomy
The butterfly was earlier known as Lycaenopsis quadriplaga (Tytler).

Range
It is found in Nagaland in India.

See also
List of butterflies of India (Lycaenidae)

Cited references

References
 

Oreolyce
Butterflies of Asia